Kyle Pickering (born 2001) is a Italy international rugby league footballer who plays as a er for the Cronulla-Sutherland Sharks in the NSW Cup.

Background
Pickering is of Italian descent.

Playing career

Club career
Pickering came through the youth system at the Cronulla Sharks, playing in the S.G. Ball Cup side in 2020, and the Jersey Flegg Cup side in 2020 and 2021.

International career
In 2022 Pickering was named in the Italy squad for the 2021 Rugby League World Cup.

References

External links
Italy profile

2001 births
Living people
Italy national rugby league team players
Rugby league wingers